Morning (styled as (m)orning) is the third EP by American alternative/indie band Mae. It was released independently on April 19, 2009, in conjunction with Mae Presents: (M)orning tour.  It contains songs played in concert in stereoscopic 3D. A limited edition scratch and sniff release of the EP, meant to smell like the ocean, was available only on the tour. The EP was released to stores on September 22, 2009, bundled with a DVD of tour and behind-the-scenes footage.

According to the band's post on their message board, "Morning represents the beginning of the day, the beginning of the year, and the beginning of a life ... [January - April] This is the season to focus on youth and help instill appreciation for music and the arts. Music is the world's language. It has the ability to bridge nations and to connect people ... These are the issues of Morning: (M)usic (A)rt (E)ducation".  All proceeds from the EP will be donated to charities chosen by the fans.

Track listing 
 "Good (m)orning" – 1:24
 "The Fisherman Song (We All Need Love)" – 8:39
 "The House That Fire Built" – 7:09
 "Boomerang" – 4:38
 "Two Birds" – 2:57
 "A Melody, the Memory" – 4:34
 "Night/Day" – 4:42
 "(m)orning Drive" – 3:03

References

External links 
 Mae's Official Website

2009 EPs
Mae albums
Tooth & Nail Records EPs